Zaire 74 was a three-day live music festival that took place on 22 to 24 September 1974 at the Stade du 20 Mai in Kinshasa, Zaire (now Democratic Republic of the Congo). The concert, conceived by South African trumpeter Hugh Masekela and record producer Stewart Levine, was meant to be a major promotional event for the heavyweight boxing championship match between Muhammad Ali and George Foreman, known as The Rumble in the Jungle. When an injury forced Foreman to postpone the fight by six weeks, the festival's intended audience of international tourists was all but eliminated and Levine had to decide whether or not to cancel the event. The decision was made to move forward, and 80,000 people attended.

In addition to promoting the Ali-Foreman fight, the Zaire 74 event was intended to present and promote racial and cultural solidarity between African American and African people. Thirty one performing groups, 17 from Zaire and 14 from overseas, performed. Featured performers included top R&B and soul artists from the United States such as James Brown, Bill Withers, B.B. King, and The Spinners as well as prominent African performers such as Miriam Makeba, Zaïko Langa Langa, TPOK Jazz, and Tabu Ley Rochereau. Other performers included Celia Cruz and the Fania All-Stars.

Background and cultural influence
The concert was promoted by Don King, as a part of the build-up to the Ali-Foreman fight.

At the time of the event, Zaire was run by Mobutu Sese Seko, a dictator who became notorious for corruption, nepotism and human rights violations. Mobutu agreed to host the festival in the hopes of improving the country's image.

A documentary about the Zaire 74 festival, entitled Soul Power, was released in 2009.  The film was directed by Jeffrey Levy-Hinte, who served as the editor on the 1996 documentary When We Were Kings, which also contains selections of concert footage from the festival.

See also

List of historic rock festivals
List of jam band music festivals

References

Music festivals in the Democratic Republic of the Congo
1974 in music
Entertainment events in the Democratic Republic of the Congo
1974 in Zaire
Democratic Republic of the Congo music
Music festivals established in 1974
Pop music festivals
Culture of Kinshasa